Moucha Airport  is an airport serving Moucha Island in Djibouti.

The status of this airport is unclear, as no records or photos of its existence can be found.

References

External links

Airports in Djibouti